The Political Machine is a government simulation game from Stardock and the first game in the Political Machine series, in which the player leads a campaign to elect the President of the United States. The player accomplishes this goal by traveling from state to state and engaging in a variety of activities to either raise money or raise poll numbers.

Each game starts with the selection of a pre-created candidate or creation of a fictional candidate from one of the two major American political parties, the Republican Party and the Democratic Party.

Headquarters and fundraisers are possible, the effectiveness of which depends on various factors.

When enough money is accumulated the player can "invest" it in advertisements (either through newspapers, radio, or TV media). The effectiveness of these ads are determined by several factors. For instance, an ad supporting tax cuts will work better with Republican Texas than with Democratic Massachusetts.

A key factor in the game is the concept of "Stamina" and "Turns." In each turn, representing one week, a candidate has a set amount of stamina to engage in activities. For example, establishing or upgrading a campaign HQ costs more stamina than creating a newspaper ad.

A sequel, The Political Machine 2008, was released on June 16, 2008, with new characters introduced, such as Barack Obama and John McCain. A second sequel, The Political Machine 2012, was released on July 31, 2012, with new characters introduced, such as Mitt Romney and Rick Santorum. A third sequel, The Political Machine 2016, was released on February 4, 2016, with new characters introduced, such as Bernie Sanders and Carly Fiorina. A fourth sequel, The Political Machine 2020, was released in March 2020.

Candidates

Basic candidates

Democrats

Bill Clinton
Hillary Clinton
John Edwards
Al Gore
Jeffory Jackson (fictitious character based on politician and 1984 and 1988 presidential candidate Jesse Jackson) 
John Kerry
Chloe Sullivan (fictitious character, possibly named after a character from the television series Smallville)
Tom Vilsack

Republican
Barbara Bush
George H. W. Bush
George W. Bush
Laura Bush
Dick Cheney
Mike Forbes (fictitious character based on 1996 and 2000 presidential candidate Steve Forbes) 
Bill Mason (although there is a Bill Mason, he is not related to politics. The computer game character is based on the 1996 Republican presidential Nominee Bob Dole) 
Condoleezza Rice
Arnold Schwarzenegger (actually ineligible for the office of U.S. President; see )

Unlockable candidates
These candidates have to be defeated by a member of the opposite party in Campaign Mode in order to unlock them.

Democratic
Wesley Clark
Jimmy Carter
Bill Richardson
Dick Gephardt
Lyndon B. Johnson
Woodrow Wilson (mislabeled as from Georgia.  Although he spent much of his childhood there, Wilson was elected from New Jersey, where he served as governor.)
Franklin D. Roosevelt
Thomas Jefferson (member of the Democratic-Republicans, predecessors to the Democrats and the Whigs, and in turn the Republicans)

Republican
William Howard Taft
Gerald Ford
Ulysses S. Grant
Richard Nixon
Theodore Roosevelt (mislabeled as from Ohio)
Ronald Reagan
Abraham Lincoln
George Washington (sympathetic to the Federalists, predecessors to the Whigs, and in turn the Republicans)

Reception

The game received "average" reviews according to video game review aggregator Metacritic.

The editors of Computer Gaming World nominated The Political Machine as their 2004 "Strategy Game of the Year (General)", although it lost to The Sims 2. They wrote, "[W]e were enamored with Stardock's The Political Machine, which let us run the 2004 presidential campaign in a way that was far more fun than its real-life counterpart." The Political Machine won Computer Games Magazines 2004 "Best Budget Game" award.

References

External links
 Official website
 

Satirical video games
Political satire video games
2004 video games
Video games based on real people
Cultural depictions of presidents of the United States
Cultural depictions of politicians
Cultural depictions of George Washington
Cultural depictions of Abraham Lincoln
Cultural depictions of Bill Clinton
Cultural depictions of Al Gore
Cultural depictions of Hillary Clinton
Cultural depictions of George H. W. Bush
Cultural depictions of George W. Bush
Cultural depictions of Lyndon B. Johnson
Cultural depictions of Theodore Roosevelt
Cultural depictions of Franklin D. Roosevelt
Cultural depictions of Thomas Jefferson
Cultural depictions of Ulysses S. Grant
Cultural depictions of Arnold Schwarzenegger
Cultural depictions of Jimmy Carter
Cultural depictions of Woodrow Wilson
Cultural depictions of Richard Nixon
Cultural depictions of Ronald Reagan
Cultural depictions of Gerald Ford
Government simulation video games
Stardock games
Ubisoft games
2004 United States presidential election
Video games developed in the United States
Windows games
Windows-only games
Video games set in the United States
Cultural depictions of William Howard Taft
Cultural depictions of Dick Cheney
Video games set in 2004
Multiplayer and single-player video games